Tease was a limited edition EP by Piano Overlord.

Track listing
 "Recuerdas?"
 "Walk Home"
 "Electric Manatee Diplo Remix"
 "Springs Arrival Express Rising Remix"

2004 EPs